Dewar Nunatak is a mainly snow-covered nunatak rising to  in the middle of Shambles Glacier, on the east coast of Adelaide Island. It was named by the UK Antarctic Place-Names Committee in 1963 for Graham J.A. Dewar, a British Antarctic Survey geologist at Adelaide station, 1961–63.

References 

Nunataks of Graham Land
Landforms of Adelaide Island